Cleopatra Mathis (born 1947 in Ruston, Louisiana) is an American poet who since 1982 has been the Frederick Sessions Beebe Professor in the English department at Dartmouth College, where she is also director of the Creative Writing Program. Her most recent book is White Sea (Sarabande Books, 2005). She is a faculty member at The Frost Place Poetry Seminar.

Life 
Born in Ruston, Mathis was raised by her Greek mother’s family, including her grandfather, who spoke no English, and her grandmother, who ran the family café. Her father left when she was six years old. Mathis received her bachelor's degree from Southwest Texas State University in 1970, and spent seven years teaching public high school. It was during this time that Mathis became interested in poetry, and she went on to earn her M.F.A. from Columbia University, graduating in 1978.

Career 
Her first five books of poems were published by Sheep Meadow Press, and are distributed by University Press of New England. Her fifth book (What to Tip the Boatman?) won the Jane Kenyon Award for Outstanding Book of Poems in 2001. Prizes and honors for her work include two National Endowment for the Arts grants, in 1984 and 2003; the Peter Lavin Award for Younger Poets from the Academy of American Poets; two Pushcart Prizes, 1980 and 2006; a poetry residency at The Frost Place in 1982; a 1981-82 Fellowship in Poetry at the Fine Arts Work Center in Provincetown, Massachusetts, and fellowship residencies at Yaddo and the MacDowell Colony; The May Sarton Award; and Individual Artist Fellowships in Poetry from both the New Hampshire State Council on the Arts and the New Jersey State Arts Council.

Cleopatra Mathis' work has appeared widely in magazines and journals, including The New Yorker, Poetry, The American Poetry Review, Tri-Quarterly, The Southern Review, The Georgia Review, AGNI, and in textbooks and anthologies including The Made Thing: An Anthology of Contemporary Southern Poetry (University of Arkansas Press, 1999), The Extraordinary Tide: Poetry by American Women (Columbia University Press, 2001), and The Practice of Poetry (HarperCollins, 1991).

Published works
 After the Body: New & Selected Poems (Sarabande Books, 2020) 
 Book of Dog (Sarabande Books, 2012) 
 White Sea (Sarabande Books, 2005) 
 What to Tip the Boatman? (Sheep Meadow Press, 2001) 
 Guardian (Sheep Meadow Press, 1995) 
 The Center for Cold Weather (Sheep Meadow Press, 1989)
 The Bottom Land (Sheep Meadow Press, 1983)
 Aerial View of Louisiana (Sheep Meadow Press, 1979)

References

External links
 Dartmouth College > English Department Faculty: Cleopatra Mathis Bio
 Sarabande Books > Cleopatra Mathis Author Page
 Poetry Foundation > Poet: Cleopatra Mathis

1947 births
Dartmouth College faculty
Living people
People from Ruston, Louisiana
Poets from Louisiana
The New Yorker people
Columbia University School of the Arts alumni
National Endowment for the Arts Fellows
American academics of English literature
American women poets
American women non-fiction writers
American women academics
21st-century American women